Stillings is an unincorporated community in Platte County, in the U.S. state of Missouri. It lies within the Kansas City metropolitan area.

History
Stillings was laid out in 1889 by Vinton Stillings, and named for him.  A post office was established at Stillings in 1890, and remained in operation until 1913.

References

Unincorporated communities in Platte County, Missouri
Unincorporated communities in Missouri